Mechamato Movie is a 2022 Malaysian computer-animated action comedy film and a prequel to the animated series Mechamato: The Animated Series. Produced by Animonsta Studios and distributed by Astro Shaw, the film is directed by Nizam Razak and stars Armand Ezra, Adzlan Nazir, Fadhli Mohd Rawi, Ielham Iskandar, Marissa Balqis, Fazreen Mohd, Hazzley Abu Bakar, and Feroz Faizal. The film follows Amato's first encounter with the MechaBot in a crashed prison spaceship where Amato eventually becomes the MechaBot's new master, leading them to be pursued by Grakakus, an evil alien.

Initially announced for a 2021 release, the film was delayed numerous times due to the COVID-19 pandemic. This caused the animated series to be released before the movie. The film's release was officially announced in September 2022.

Mechamato Movie has been released in Malaysia and Brunei on 8 December 2022.

Plot
A young boy named Amato came discovered the powerful robot MechaBot after a mysterious spaceship crash-landed on Earth. Amato can now utilize MechaBot's special ability to Mechanize common objects into high-tech devices thanks to his success in outsmarting the robot and becoming its master. Unknown to him, the cybernetic alien Grakakus is after MechaBot and would stop at nothing to obtain it for his own evil goals.

Cast
 Armand Ezra as Amato / Mechamato
 Adzlan Nazir as MechaBot
 Fadhli Mohd Rawi as Grakakus
 Ielham Iskandar as Pian
 Marissa Balqis as Mara
 Fazreen Mohd as Tok Sah
 Hazzley Abu Bakar as Mayor Andy
 Feroz Faizal as Mr. Aman and Troket
 Syabil Syamin as Deep
 Anas Abdul Aziz as Aba
 Siti Salwa Samsudin as Umi
 Nizam Razak as Bago Go and Bula
 Azrul Fazlan Hamdan as Bili

Production
The production for the movie started as early as 2019, when Monsta revealed the plan for Mechamato on a video for their 2020 plans as a feature-film project, which features the cutscenes from the movie. The movie production was temporarily halted to make way for the production of the animated series first after the movie released was delayed. Astro Shaw is confirmed as the distributor, while MDEC provided part of the funds and market access for Mechamato. In March 2022, the creator Nizam Razak said that due to the change in the screening sequence, the storyline will be changed a bit compared to the original plan. The movie which was 70% ready needs to be reworked to ensure that the storyline is more oriented towards the 'Origin Story'. In July 2022, they confirmed that they are working on getting the movie dubbed in Japanese, Korean and English. In November 2022, the creator mentioned that the tone of the movie will be more mature than the series. The English version is expected to be completed by March 2023. The initial duration was about 100 minutes, but Monsta extended it to 122 minutes as a result of changes and improvements to guarantee the audience's satisfaction. The final Digital Cinema Package (DCP) of the movie has been submitted to the cinemas on 23 November 2022.

Music
The movie's theme song is performed by Yonnyboii titled "Temaniku", which was officially launched on 18 November 2022. Co-composed by Yonnyboii and Fitri Zain, Monsta's Chief Operating Officer Kee Yong Pin expressed his excitement at being able to work with an influential singer who is able to tap into the tastes of today's young generation. This song makes togetherness in achieving a goal as a message and inspiration, no matter if it is for the integrity of the relationship between friends, family, team or special friends. Kee Yong Pin also revealed that the process of making this theme song was done remotely, with MONSTA contacting a young composer from Sabah, Fitri Zain, after being interested in the music on his YouTube channel. Yonnyboii worked on the lyrics and finally, this song was produced, with Fitri Zain never meeting face to face with MONSTA until this film was released.

Marketing
The official trailer was released on 1 January 2021, intended for the release of 2021 before it was postponed. On 8 July 2022, Monsta released the official poster reveal video on their YouTube channel. The final trailer and the official poster were revealed on 8 November 2022, a month before the release.

As an effort to promote this film, MONSTA in collaboration with Golden Screen Cinemas and Air Selangor has organized a running event, GSC x Air Selangor Hydro Run which was held on 26 November 2022 at IOI City Mall, Putrajaya. This event was attended by approximately 3,500 participants. GSC also exclusively produced the limited Mechamato figurines and popcorn boxes that the moviegoers can buy. MONSTA also collaborated with 10 Star Cinemas to release an exclusive MechaBot keychain which can be purchased for RM10 each.

On 1 December 2022, MONSTA premiered the first 10 minutes of the movie on Astro On Demand, while the release on YouTube came one day later.

Release
Mechamato Movie was originally planned to be released in 2020, but postponed to 2021. However, due to uncertainty over the COVID-19 pandemic situation and vaccination, the film was postponed several times, from November or December 2020 to March 2021 to May or June 2021 and finally until end 2021. However, plans to release the film earlier than the animated series were cancelled due to the COVID-19 pandemic and the animated series had already been developed according to schedule which is set to be released in December 2021. The movie would be released after the first season of the animated series or even later, based on the COVID-19 situation. In March 2022, the creator Nizam Razak said that they were confident that they could release the film by 2022, while discussions with the cinemas to get the best slots and screening dates had already begun. On 8 July 2022, Nizam announced that Monsta is working on getting the release date and shall be released during the year-end school holidays in Malaysia, Indonesia and Brunei. On 15 September 2022, it has been announced that the movie will be released on 8 December 2022 in Malaysian cinemas. On 9 November 2022, the release of the film in Brunei also on 8 December 2022 has been confirmed, while for other countries, the release would only start from 2023. Although the official release only starts on November 8, a day-early sneak preview is also available throughout Malaysia. On 21 February 2023, Indonesia's release date has confirmed which is 1 March 2023. Then on March 2, the English version release date has confirmed on 9 March 2023 in Singapore.

Reception 

Mechamato Movie managed to rake in RM1.1 million on its first day. The film managed to collect RM5 million in just three days. It managed to reach RM10 million after 6 days, matching the budget for this film. The film has collected RM30.75 million after only 22 days, breaking the record as the highest-grossing local animated film after overtaking Ejen Ali: The Movie, and the second highest-grossing animated film in Malaysia, only behind Frozen II.

References

External links 
 

Malaysian animated films
Animated action films
Animonsta Studios